Patrick Lyon D'Andrimont served as the president of the Asociación de Guías y Scouts de Chile, president of the Interamerican Scout Committee, and Vice-Chairman of the World Scout Committee.

Background 
Lyon was camp chief of the 19th World Scout Jamboree at Picarquín, Chile.

In 2004, Lyon was awarded the 301st Bronze Wolf, the only distinction of the World Organization of the Scout Movement, awarded by the World Scout Committee for exceptional services to world Scouting.

References

External links

Recipients of the Bronze Wolf Award
Year of birth missing
Scouting and Guiding in Chile